Vijayaraghava Perumal temple is a Vishnu temple in Thiruputkuli, a village in Kanchipuram district in Tamil Nadu, India. It is situated about 7 miles west of Kanchipuram and half a kilometre from Baluchetti Chattiram, which lies on the Chennai - Vellore highway. Constructed in Dravidian style of architecture, the temple is glorified in the Naalayira Divya Prabandham, the early medieval Tamil canon of the Alvar saints from the 6th–9th centuries CE. It is counted as one among the 108 Divya Desams dedicated to Vishnu. Vishnu is worshiped as Vijayaraghava Perumal and his consort Lakshmi as Maragathavalli Thayar.

The temple is believed to be of significant antiquity and is believed to be initiated by the Pandyas, with later contributions at different times from Cholas and Thanjavur Nayaks. The temple has three inscriptions dating from the Chola period. The temple has a five-tiered rajagopuram (gateway tower) and enshrined within a granite wall. The complex contains all the shrines while the temple tank, is located to the west of the temple. The Brahmotsavam festival celebrated in the Tamil month of Masi (February - March), Theppotsavam (float festival) in Thai (January - February) are the major festivals celebrated in the temple.

Architecture 
The temple is believed to have been built by the Pandya kings during the 13th century, as seen from the stone inscriptions in the temple. The temple here is one among the 108 Divya Desams and is dedicated to Vijayaraghavaswamy (Mulavar). There is a separate temple for Thayar in the form of Margathavalli Thayar and a sannidhi for Sri Ramanuja. The central shrine houses the image of the presiding deity, Vijayaraghava sported with four hands. He is seen in a posture holding the demigod bird Jatayu and performing the last rites. Sridevi and Bhudevi are sported along with their head facing earth. It is believed that the image is sported to indicate sorrow on the faces. Sridevi who is usually sported on the right side of Perumal is located to his left in this temple probably because of the sorrow created by the death of Jatayu. Ramanuja, the preceptor of Visishtadvaita philosophy had his early education at this temple.

Legend 

Jatayu, the demigod bird of the Ramayana, was killed by the rakshasa king Ravana, while trying to save Sita during the abduction. Rama, the avatar of Vishnu and the hero of the Ramayana, who was in search of his wife Sita, are regarded to have arrived at this place. When Rama and Lakshmana went there in search of Sita, they find Jatayu mortally wounded in the forest. The eagle Jatayu narrated these events to Rama before breathing his last. The presiding deity, Vijayaraghava Perumal, is believed to have performed the last rites of Jatayu at this place. The water body where Jatayu fell is called Jatayu Tirtham. Jatayu belongs to the Pul (a separate family of eagle) family and was buried in a pit (Tamil: kuli), and hence this site is called Thiruputkuḻi. The same legend is also associated with Thirupullabhoothangudi Temple.

Religious importance

The temple is revered in Naalayira Divya Prabandham, the 7th–9th century Vaishnava canon, by Thirumangai Alvar in one hymn. The temple is classified as a Divya Desam, one of the 108 Vishnu temples that are mentioned in the book. Thiruputkuḻi is believed to be the birthplace of Yadava Prakaasa, the teacher of Vaishanava saint Ramanuja and also that of Pinpaḻagiya Perumal Jeeyar. Vedanta Desika composed hymns praising the presiding deity. Thirumangai Alvar has also revered the temple in his verses. The temple follows Pancharaktha Agama and the worship practises are carried out by hereditary priests belonging to the Porakathi Bhattar sect.

Festival and religious practices
The temple priests perform the puja (rituals) during festivals and on a daily basis. As at other Vishnu temples of Tamil Nadu, the priests belong to the Vaishnavaite community, a Brahmin varna. The temple rituals are performed six times a day: Ushathkalam at 7 a.m., Kalasanthi at 8:00 a.m., Uchikalam at 12:00 p.m., Sayarakshai at 5:00 p.m., Irandamkalam at 6:00 p.m. and Ardha Jamam at 7:30 p.m. Each ritual has three steps: alangaram (decoration), neivethanam (food offering) and deepa aradanai (waving of lamps) for both Vijayaraghava Perumal and Maragathavalli. During the last step of worship, nadasvaram (pipe instrument) and tavil (percussion instrument) are played, religious instructions in the Vedas (sacred text) are recited by priests, and worshippers prostrate themselves in front of the temple mast. There are weekly, monthly and fortnightly rituals performed in the temple. The Brahmotsavam festival celebrated in the Tamil month of Masi (February - March), Theppotsavam (float festival) in Thai (January - February), Pavitrotsavam in Avani and  Vaikuntha Ekadashi celebrated during the Tamil month of Margaḻi (December–January) are the major festivals celebrated in the temple. Srisukta Homam, a religious practice, is performed in the temple with 108 lotus leaves on full moon days.

References

External

 
 

 
Hindu temples in Kanchipuram district
Vishnu temples